The 2015 Savannah mayoral election took place on November 5 and December 1, 2015. It saw the election of Eddie DeLoach, who unseated incumbent mayor Edna Jackson.

This was the first time in over 20 years that an incumbent mayor of Savannah lost reelection. Eddie DeLoach became the first person elected mayor of Savannah to identify as a Republican since Susan Weiner was in 1991.

First round

Runoff

References

Mayoral elections in Savannah, Georgia
2015 Georgia (U.S. state) elections
Savannah